Bidesgan (also Romanized as Bīdesgān, Bīdsagān, and Bīdeskān; also known as Bidishkūn) is a village in Baghestan Rural District, in the Eslamiyeh District of Ferdows County, South Khorasan Province, Iran. At the 2006 census, its population was 309, in 145 families.

References 

Populated places in Ferdows County